Mario Heredia (born 12 December 1992) is a Mexican professional boxer who once held the WBC FECOMBOX heavyweight title. As an amateur, he represented Mexico at the 2011 World Amateur Boxing Championships.

Amateur career
Heredia had an amateur record of 47-5 and was a two-time Mexican National Olympics gold medalists. He represented Mexico in the World Series Boxing, he even scored an upset knockout over undefeated Donovan Dennis. Heredia also competed at the 2011 Pan American Games.

Professional career
On May 14, 2012 Heredia beat the veteran José Carlos Rodríguez by K.O. in the second round. This bout was held at the Arandas Municipal Auditorium in Arandas, Jalisco, Mexico.

References

External links

1992 births
Living people
Sportspeople from Ciudad Juárez
Boxers from Chihuahua (state)
Heavyweight boxers
Boxers at the 2011 Pan American Games
Pan American Games competitors for Mexico
Mexican male boxers